Judah Emmanuel García (born 24 October 2000) is a Trinidadian professional footballer who plays as an attacking midfielder for Greek Super League 2 club AEK Athens B and the Trinidad and Tobago national team.

Club career
García born in Santa Flora, Trinidad and Tobago. He comes from a football family consisting of three brothers (Daniel, Nathaniel, and Levi) all play professional football. García joined junior team of Point Fortin in 2017 and later joined senior team.

NEROCA
In November 2020, Imphal based club NEROCA completed the signing of Trinidad and Tobago international, Judah García for 2020–21 season of I-League. He scored 3 goals in 12 league matches as NEROCA were relegated, but were reinstated by AIFF after the viewing the situation of Covid-19 pandemic.

International career

Youth
García has represented Trinidad and Tobago at Trinidad and Tobago U20 and Trinidad and Tobago U22 levels.

Senior
Following his impressive season with Point Fortin, García was included by manager Dennis Lawrence in a friendly game against Panama. He made his debut after coming off the bench in the 81st minute, replacing Marcus Joseph.

International goals

Personal life 
Judah García is the younger brother of Daniel García, Nathaniel García and Levi García.

References

External links

2000 births
Living people
Trinidad and Tobago footballers
Trinidad and Tobago international footballers
Point Fortin Civic F.C. players
NEROCA FC players
Association football forwards
I-League players
Trinidad and Tobago expatriate footballers
Trinidad and Tobago expatriate sportspeople in India
Expatriate footballers in India
Trinidad and Tobago under-20 international footballers
AEK Athens F.C. B players
Trinidad and Tobago expatriate sportspeople in Greece
Expatriate footballers in Greece